Topic, topics, TOPIC, topical, or topicality may refer to:

Topic / Topics 
 Topić, a Slavic surname
 Topics (Aristotle), a work by Aristotle
 Topic (chocolate bar), a brand of confectionery bar
 Topic (DJ), German musician
 Topic (grammar)
 Topic (linguistics), the information motivating a sentence or clause's structure
 Topic: The Washington & Jefferson College Review, an academic journal
 Topic Records, a British record label
 In topic-based authoring, a topic is a discrete piece of content that is about a specific subject, has an identifiable purpose, and can stand alone
 Topic Studios, a production organization and streaming video service run by First Look Media

TOPIC 
 TOPIC, an Internet Relay Chat (IRC) command setting a channel's title
 BID 770, a British cipher machine codenamed "TOPIC"

Topicality 
 Topicality (policy debate), a stock issue in policy debate

See also 
 On-topic
 
 
 
 Subject (disambiguation)